Thailand is home to 71 living languages, with the majority of people speaking languages of the Southwestern Tai family, and the national language being Thai. Lao is spoken along the borders with the Lao PDR, Karen languages are spoken along the border with Myanmar, Khmer is spoken near Cambodia and Malay is spoken in the south near Malaysia. Sixty-two 'domestic' languages are officially recognized, and international languages spoken in Thailand, primarily by international workers, expatriates and business people, include Burmese, Karen, English, Chinese, Japanese, and Vietnamese, among others.

Officially recognized languages

National breakdown 
The following table comprises all 62 ethnolinguistic groups recognized by the Royal Thai Government in the 2011 Country Report to the UN Committee responsible for the International Convention for the Elimination of All Forms of Racial Discrimination, available from the Department of Rights and Liberties Promotion of the Thai Ministry of Justice.

Regional breakdown 
Regional language data is limited. The following table shows all the language families of Northeast Thailand, as recognized in the report which is the source for the national breakdown.

Note that numbers of speakers are for the Northeast region only. Languages may have additional speakers outside the Northeast.

Provincial breakdown 
Provincial-level language data is limited; those interested are directed to the Ethnolinguistic Maps of Thailand resource, or to the Ethnologue Thailand country report.

Topolects 

The sole official language of Thailand is Central Thai (Siamese), a native language in Central (including the Bangkok Metropolitan Region), Southwestern, and Eastern Thailand, along with Thai Chinese ethnic enclaves in outer parts of the country such as Hatyai, Bandon, Nangrong, and Mueang Khonkaen. Central Thai is a Kra-Dai language closely related to Lao, Shan, and numerous indigenous languages of southern China and northern Vietnam. It is the principal language of education and government and is spoken throughout the country. The standard is written in the Thai alphabet, an abugida that evolved from the Khmer script.

There are several Thai topolects. The Central Thai and Southern Thai is successors of Sukhothai language which developed during 17th century. Northern Thai is spoken in the northern provinces that were formerly part of the independent kingdom of Lan Na, while Isan (a Thai variant of Lao) and Phu Thai are native languages of the northeast. All languages are partially mutually intelligible with Central Thai, with the degree depending on standard sociolinguistic factors. Although all are classified as a separate language by most linguists, the Thai government has historically treated them as dialects of one "Thai language" for political reasons of Thai national identity building. In the 2010 national census, filling in the four Thai languages are not option.

For Central Thai varieties, it has been then deeply influenced by almost all regional languages of Thailand, significantly known as "Pud thongdaeng", "Isan pud Klang", or "Khon nuea pud klang" for Southerner, Northeasterner and Northerner respectively. For Central Thai itself, there are also many regional accents and dialects known as "Ner" (lit: Improper Central Thai dialects) such as "Ner yudya", "Ner suphan", "Ner Khorat" etc.

the Lao-based Isan in the Northeast and Kham muang in the North, is precarious given that they are not well supported in Thailand's language education policy. The Peranakan in Southern Thailand speak Southern Thai at home.

Minority languages 
The position of all minority languages, including the largest, i.e., Yawi in the far south, a dialect of Malay, is the primary community language of the Malay Muslims. Khmer is spoken by older Northern Khmer. Varieties of Chinese are also spoken by the older Thai Chinese population, with the Teochew dialect being best represented. However, the vast majority of Thai Chinese and Northern Khmer speak Central Thai.

Sign languages 

Several village sign languages are reported among the mountain peoples ('hill tribes'), though it is not clear whether these are independent languages, as only Ban Khor Sign Language has been described. Two related deaf-community sign languages developed in Chiangmai and Bangkok; the national Thai Sign Language developed from these under the influence of American Sign Language.

Endangerment status of languages 
The 2014 Ethnologue country report for Thailand, which uses the EGIDS language endangerment assessment scale, lists one national language (Central Thai), one educational language (Isan), 27 developing languages, 18 vigorous languages, 17 threatened languages, and 7 dying languages.

Most widely spoken languages

ICERD 2011 country report data 
The following table shows ethnolinguistic groups in Thailand with equal to or more than 400,000 speakers according to the Royal Thai Government's 2011 Country Report to the Committee Responsible for the International Convention on the Elimination of All Forms of Racial Discrimination (ICERD).:99 and the Ethnolinguistic Maps of Thailand project. Note that the degree to which language speakers will have shifted in their idiolects towards Central Thai will depend on standard sociolinguistic factors, like age, education, gender, and proximity to an urban center.

Ethnolinguistic groups of Thailand with equal to or more than 400,000 speakers:99

Ethnologue data 
The figures in the following table are for first language speakers, following Ethnologue. Note that Ethnologue describes 'Isan' as 'Northeastern Thai', following Thai government practice until the 2011 Country Report.

Languages by number of speakers in Thailand with more than 400,000 speakers (with Expanded Graded Intergenerational Disruption Scale)

aExpanded Graded Intergenerational Disruption Scale (EGIDS) of Ethnologue:
0 (International): "The language is widely used between nations in trade, knowledge exchange, and international policy."
1 (National): "The language is used in education, work, mass media, and government at the national level."
2 (Provincial): "The language is used in education, work, mass media, and government within major administrative subdivisions of a nation."
3 (Wider Communication): "The language is used in work and mass media without official status to transcend language differences across a region."
4 (Educational): "The language is in vigorous use, with standardization and literature being sustained through a widespread system of institutionally supported education."
5 (Developing): "The language is in vigorous use, with literature in a standardized form being used by some though this is not yet widespread or sustainable."
6a (Vigorous): "The language is used for face-to-face communication by all generations and the situation is sustainable."
6b (Threatened): "The language is used for face-to-face communication within all generations, but it is losing users."
7 (Shifting): "The child-bearing generation can use the language among themselves, but it is not being transmitted to children."
8a (Moribund): "The only remaining active users of the language are members of the grandparent generation and older."
8b (Nearly Extinct): "The only remaining users of the language are members of the grandparent generation or older who have little opportunity to use the language."
9 (Dormant): "The language serves as a reminder of heritage identity for an ethnic community, but no one has more than symbolic proficiency."
10 (Extinct): "The language is no longer used and no one retains a sense of ethnic identity associated with the language."

Census data 
The following table employs 2000 census data and includes international languages. Caution should be exercised with Thai census data on first language. In Thai censuses, the four largest Tai-Kadai languages of Thailand (in order, Central Thai, Isan (majority Lao), Kam Mueang, Pak Tai) are not provided as options for language or ethnic group. People stating such a language as a first language, including Lao, are allocated to 'Thai'. This explains the disparity between the three tables in this section. For instance, self-reporting as Lao has been prohibited, due to the prohibition of the Lao ethnonym in the context of describing Thai citizens, for approximately one hundred years. The 2011 Country Report data is therefore more comprehensive in that it differentiates between the four largest Tai-Kadai languages of Thailand and between languages described as 'local languages' and 'dialects and others' in the census. 

* Above the age of five

Language education policy 
Thai is the language of education. The curriculum introduced by the 1999 National Education Act, which introduced 12 years of free education, emphasized Thai as being the national language. The 2008 Basic Education Core Curriculum prioritises Thai, although it also mentions 'dialects' and 'local languages', i.e., ethnic minority languages. The monolingual education system is generally seen as ineffective, with one-third of teenagers functionally illiterate. Illiteracy in Thai is particularly widespread in Thailand's three southernmost provinces as the Patani dialect of Malay is the mother tongue for the majority Malay community. International programs and schools which teach, for example, English or Chinese alongside Thai exist, as do a small number of pilot projects to teach ethnic minority languages alongside Thai in Thai schools.

See also 
 Demographics of Thailand
 Ethnic minorities of Thailand
 Kra-dai languages
 Nationality, religion, and language data for the provinces of Thailand
 Southwestern Tai languages
 Thai language

Further reading
Bradley, D. 2007. East and Southeast Asia. In C. Moseley (ed.), Encyclopedia of the world’s endangered languages, pp. 349–424. London: Routledge.
Bradley, D. 2007. Languages of Mainland South-East Asia. In O. Miyaoka, O. Sakiyama, and M. E. Krauss (eds.), The vanishing languages of the Pacific Rim, pp. 301–336. Oxford Linguistics. Oxford: Oxford University Press.
Ethnolinguistic Maps of Thailand. 2004. (in Thai). Office of the National Culture Commission, Bangkok.
Lebar, F. M., G. C. Hickey, and J. K. Musgrave. 1964. Ethnic groups of mainland Southeast Asia. New Haven: Human Relations Area Files Press (HRAF).
Luangthongkum, Theraphan. 2007. The Position of Non-Thai Languages in Thailand. In Lee Hock Guan & L. Suryadinata (Eds.), Language, nation and development in Southeast Asia (pp. 181–194). Singapore: ISEAS Publishing.
Matisoff, J. A. 1991. Endangered languages of Mainland Southeast Asia. In R. H. Robins and E. M. Uhlenbeck (eds.), Endangered languages, pp. 189–228. Oxford: Berg Publishers.
Matisoff, J. A., S. P. Baron, and J. B. Lowe. 1996. Languages and dialects of Tibeto-Burman. Sino-Tibetan Etymological Dictionary and Thesaurus Monograph Series 1 and 2. Berkeley: University of California Press.
Smalley, W. 1994. Linguistic Diversity and National Unity: Language Ecology in Thailand. Chicago: University of Chicago Press.
Suwilai Premsrirat. 2004. "Using GIS For Displaying An Ethnolinguistic Map of Thailand." In Papers from the Eleventh Annual Meeting of the Southeast Asian Linguistics Society, edited by Somsonge Burusphat. Tempe, Arizona, 599–617. Arizona State University, Program for Southeast Asian Studies.

References

External links 
 Languages of Thailand at Muturzikin.com
 Languages of Thailand at Ethnologue